Diana Romagnoli (born 14 February 1977) is a Swiss fencer. She won a silver medal in the women's team épée event at the 2000 Summer Olympics.

References

External links
 

1977 births
Living people
Swiss female épée fencers
Olympic fencers of Switzerland
Fencers at the 2000 Summer Olympics
Olympic silver medalists for Switzerland
Olympic medalists in fencing
People from Meilen District
Medalists at the 2000 Summer Olympics
Sportspeople from the canton of Zürich